David Dean Thompson (November 17, 1897 – September 9, 1959) was an American football wingback for the Cincinnati Celts of the National Football League (NFL).

References

1897 births
1959 deaths
Players of American football from Ohio
Cincinnati Celts players